Ruaidhri Ua Flaithbheartaigh (died 1145) was King of Iar Connacht.

Biography

The succession of the chiefs of Muintir Murchada after 1098 is uncertain, unless it is that Ruaidhri reigned from then until his death in 1145. However, as of 1117, Brian Ua Flaithbertaigh was Chief of the Name. 

The annals simply state that "The men of Munster proceeded with an army into Connaught; and they carried off Ua Ceallaigh, i.e. Tadhg, son of Conchobhar, lord of Ui-Maine, and slew Ruaidhri Ua Flaithbheartaigh."

See also

 Ó Flaithbertaigh

References

 West or H-Iar Connaught, Ruaidhrí Ó Flaithbheartaigh, 1684 (published 1846, ed. James Hardiman).
 Origin of the Surname O'Flaherty, Anthony Matthews, Dublin, 1968, p. 40.
 Irish Kings and High-Kings, Francis John Byrne (2001), Dublin: Four Courts Press, 
 Annals of Ulster at CELT: Corpus of Electronic Texts at University College Cork
 Byrne, Francis John (2001), Irish Kings and High-Kings, Dublin: Four Courts Press, 

People from County Galway
1145 deaths
Ruaidhri
12th-century Irish monarchs
Year of birth unknown